The Paramount Theatre Building is a historic movie palace and theater and now church, located at 145 North County Road and Sunrise Avenue, Palm Beach, Florida.

History
It was designed in the Moorish Revival and Spanish Colonial Revival styles by Joseph Urban in 1926.  Urban also designed the nearby Mar-a-Lago and the Palm Beach Bath and Tennis Club.

By contrast to the Ziegfeld Theatre (1927), which Urban designed to bathe the audience in warmth and a general atmosphere of colorful gaiety, the Paramount Theatre employs simple lines and a cool, leisured palette of silver and green. "The theatre," Urban explained, "is not an escape from the life around, but a part of it, fitting into the rhythm of the community. The architecture of the Paramount Theatre … is accordingly simple, spacious, Southern."

On December 12, 1973, it was added to the U.S. National Register of Historic Places.

Church
The Paramount Theatre Building now houses the Paramount Church, a non-denominational Christian church in Palm Beach. The Senior Pastor and Founder of Paramount Church is Rev. Dwight Stevens. The church sold the building in March 2021 to Woerners.

References

https://therealdeal.com/miami/2021/03/24/woerners-buy-historic-paramount-theatre-in-palm-beach-for-14m/

External links

Flheritage: Florida Office of Cultural and Historical Programs
Flheritage: Paramount Theatre Building
Flheritage: Palm Beach County listings
Official Paramount Church Website

Cinemas and movie theaters in Florida
Theatres on the National Register of Historic Places in Florida
Movie palaces
Evangelical churches in Florida
Former cinemas in the United States
National Register of Historic Places in Palm Beach County, Florida
Historic American Buildings Survey in Florida
Moorish Revival architecture in Florida
Spanish Colonial Revival architecture in Florida
Churches in Palm Beach County, Florida
1926 establishments in Florida
Theatres completed in 1926